Man and His Kingdom may refer to:

 Man and His Kingdom (novel), a novel by A.E.W. Mason
 Man and His Kingdom (film), a 1922 film directed by Maurice Elvey